The Best of Aldo Nova is a compilation album by Canadian rock musician Aldo Nova, released in 2006. It features songs from his first three albums.

Track listing
All tracks composed by Aldo Nova; except where noted.
"Fantasy" - 5:05
"Foolin' Yourself" - 3:36
"Ball and Chain" - 4:03
"Hot Love" - 3:56
"You're My Love" - 3:35
"Monkey On Your Back" - 4:36
"Hey Operator" - 3:55
"Cry Baby Cry" - 4:18
"Victim of a Broken Heart" (Bruno, Nova) - 4:17
"Always Be Mine" - 4:12
"Tonight (Lift Me Up)" (DeLuca, Nova) - 4:14
"Rumours of You" - 4:56
"Heartless" (Hunter) - 3:17
"Fallen Angel" (Bradman, Nova) - 4:25
"Twitch" (Nova, Rudetsky) - 2:28

References

Aldo Nova albums
Albums produced by Aldo Nova
2006 greatest hits albums
Portrait Records compilation albums